bbc1 or variation, may refer to:

 Bbc1 (gene), coding for 60S ribosomal protein L13
 BBC One, British TV network
 BBC Radio 1, British radio network
 BBC Radio 1Xtra, British sister station of Radio 1
 믁 (U+BBC1), unicode character; see List of modern Hangul characters in ISO/IEC 2022–compliant national character set standards

See also
 BBC First, international television service
 
 BBCi (disambiguation)
 BBC (disambiguation)